Alkali, or Alkaline, soils are clay soils with high pH (greater than 8.5), a poor soil structure and a low infiltration capacity. Often they have a hard calcareous layer at 0.5 to 1 metre depth. Alkali soils owe their unfavorable physico-chemical properties mainly to the dominating presence of sodium carbonate, which causes the soil to swell and difficult to clarify/settle. They derive their name from the alkali metal group of elements, to which sodium belongs, and which can induce basicity. Sometimes these soils are also referred to as alkaline sodic soils.
Alkaline soils are basic, but not all basic soils are alkaline.

Causes

The causes of soil alkalinity can be natural or man-made:
 The natural cause is the presence of soil minerals producing sodium carbonate (Na2CO3) and sodium bicarbonate (NaHCO3) upon weathering.
 Coal-fired boilers / power plants, when using coal or lignite rich in limestone, produce ash containing calcium oxide. CaO readily dissolves in water to form slaked lime, Ca(OH)2, and carried by rain water to rivers / irrigation water. Lime softening process precipitates Ca2+ and Mg2+ ions / removes hardness in the water and also converts sodium bicarbonates in river water into sodium carbonate. Sodium carbonates (washing soda) further reacts with the remaining Ca2+ and Mg2+ in the water to remove / precipitate the total hardness. Also water-soluble sodium salts present in the ash enhance the sodium content in water. The global coal consumption in the world was 7.7 billion tons in the year 2011. Thus river water is made devoid of Ca2+ and Mg2+ ions and enhanced Na+ by coal-fired boilers.
 Many sodium salts are used in industrial and domestic applications such as sodium carbonate, sodium bicarbonate (baking soda), sodium sulphate, sodium hydroxide (caustic soda), sodium hypochlorite (bleaching powder),  etc. in huge quantities. These salts are mainly produced from sodium chloride (common salt). All the sodium in these salts enter into the river / ground water during their production process or consumption enhancing water sodicity. The total global consumption of sodium chloride is 270 million tons in the year 2010. This is nearly equal to the salt load in the mighty Amazon River. Man made sodium salts contribution is nearly 7% of total salt load of all the rivers. Sodium salt load problem aggravates in the downstream of intensively cultivated river basins located in China, India, Egypt, Pakistan, west Asia,  Australia, western US, etc. due to accumulation of salts in the remaining water after meeting various transpiration and evaporation losses.
 Another source of man made sodium salts addition to the agriculture fields / land mass is in the vicinity of the wet cooling towers using sea water to dissipate waste heat generated in various industries located near the sea coast. Huge capacity cooling towers are installed in oil refineries, petrochemical complexes, fertilizer plants, chemical plants, nuclear & thermal power stations, centralized HVAC systems, etc. The drift / fine droplets emitted from the cooling towers contain nearly 6% sodium chloride which would deposit on the vicinity areas. This problem aggravates where the national pollution control norms are not imposed or not implemented to minimize the drift emissions to the best industrial norm for the sea water based wet cooling towers. 
 The man-made cause is the application of softened water in irrigation (surface or ground water) containing relatively high proportion of sodium bicarbonates and less calcium and magnesium.

Agricultural problems
Alkaline soils are difficult to take into agricultural production. Due to the low infiltration capacity, rain water stagnates on the soil easily and, in dry periods, cultivation is hardly possible without copious irrigated water and good drainage.  Agriculture is limited to crops tolerant to surface waterlogging (e.g. rice, grass) and the productivity is lower.

Chemistry
Soil alkalinity is associated with the presence of sodium carbonate (Na2CO3) or sodium bicarbonate (NaHCO3) in the soil, either as a result of natural weathering of the soil particles or brought in by irrigation and/or flood water.

This salt is extremely soluble, when it undergoes hydration, it dissociates in: 

 → 2  + 

The carbonate anion , is a weak base accepting a proton, so it hydrolyses in water to give the bicarbonate ion and a hydroxyl ion:

 +  →  + 

which in turn gives carbonic acid and hydroxyl:

 +  →  + 

See carbonate for the equilibrium of carbonate-bicarbonate-carbon dioxide.

The above reactions are similar to the dissolution of calcium carbonate, the solubility of the two salts being the only difference.

Notes:
 Water (H2O) is partly dissociated into H3O+ (hydronium) and OH– (hydroxyl) ions. The ion H3O+ has a positive electric charge (+) and its concentration is usually written as [H+]. The hydroxyl ion OH– has a negative charge (−) and its concentration is written as [OH−].
 In pure water, at 25 °C, the dissociation constant of water (Kw) is 10−14.Since Kw = [H+] × [OH–], then both the concentration of H3O+ and OH– ions equal 10−7 M (a very small concentration).
 In neutral water, the pH, being the negative decimal logarithm of the H3O+ concentration, it is 7. Similarly, the pOH is also 7. Each unit decrease in pH indicates a tenfold increase of the H3O+ concentration. Similarly, each unit increase in pH indicates a tenfold increase of the OH– concentration.
 In water with dissolved salts, the concentrations of the H3O+ and the OH– ions may change, but their sum remains constant, namely . A pH of 7 therefore corresponds to a pOH of 7, and a pH of 9 with a pOH of 5.
 Formally it is preferred to express the ion concentrations in terms of chemical activity, but this hardly affects the value of the pH.
 Water with excess H3O+ ions is called acid, and water with excess OH– ions is called alkaline or rather basic.

H2CO3 (carbonic acid) is unstable and produces H2O (water) and CO2 (carbon dioxide gas, escaping into the atmosphere). This explains the remaining alkalinity (or rather basicity) in the form of soluble sodium hydroxide and the high pH or low pOH.

Not all the dissolved sodium carbonate undergoes the above chemical reaction. The remaining sodium carbonate, and hence the presence of  ions, causes CaCO3 (which is only slightly soluble) to precipitate as solid calcium carbonate (limestone), because the product of the   concentration and the  Ca2+ concentration exceeds the allowable limit. Hence, the calcium ions Ca2+ are immobilized.

The presence of abundant Na+ ions in the soil solution and the precipitation of Ca2+ ions as a solid mineral causes the clay particles, which have negative electric charges along their surfaces, to adsorb more Na+ in the diffuse adsorption zone (DAZ, also more commonly called diffuse double layer (DDL), or electrical double layer (EDL), see the corresponding figure) and, in exchange, release previously adsorbed Ca2+, by which their exchangeable sodium percentage (ESP) is increased as illustrated in the same figure.

Na+ is more mobile and has a smaller electric charge than Ca2+ so that the thickness of the DDL increases as more sodium ions occupy it. The DDL thickness is also influenced by the total concentration of ions in the soil moisture in the sense that higher concentrations cause the DDL zone to shrink.

Clay particles with considerable ESP (> 16), in contact with non-saline soil moisture have an expanded DDL zone and the soil swells (dispersion).
The phenomenon results in deterioration of the soil structure, and especially crust formation and compaction of the top layer.
Hence the infiltration capacity of the soil and the water availability in the soil is reduced, whereas the surface-water-logging or surface runoff is increased. Seedling emergence and crop production are badly affected.

Note:
 Under saline conditions, the many ions in the soil solution counteract the swelling of the soil, so that saline soils usually do not have unfavorable physical properties. Alkaline soils, in principle, are not saline since the alkalinity problem is worse as the salinity is less.

Alkalinity problems are more pronounced in clay soils than in loamy, silty or sandy soils. The clay soils containing montmorillonite or smectite (swelling clays) are more subject to alkalinity problems than illite or kaolinite clay soils. The reason is that the former types of clay have larger specific surface areas (i.e. the surface area of the soil particles divided by their volume) and higher cation exchange capacity (CEC).

Note:
 Certain clay minerals with almost 100% ESP (i.e. almost fully sodium saturated) are called bentonite, which is used in civil engineering to place impermeable curtains in the soil, e.g. below dams, to prevent seepage of water.

The quality of the irrigation water in relation to the alkalinity hazard is expressed by the following two indexes:
The sodium adsorption ratio (SAR)

The formula for calculating sodium adsorption ratio is:

SAR =  = 
where: [ ] stands for concentration in milliequivalents/liter (briefly meq/L), and { } stands for concentration in mg/L.

It is seen that Mg (magnesium) is thought to play a similar role as Ca (calcium).

The SAR should not be much higher than 20 and preferably less than 10;

When the soil has been exposed to water with a certain SAR value for some time, the ESP value tends to become about equal to the SAR value.
The residual sodium carbonate (RSC, meq/L):

The formula for calculating the residual sodium carbonate is:

which must not be much higher than 1 and preferably less than 0.5.

The above expression recognizes the presence of bicarbonates, the form in which most carbonates are dissolved.
While calculating SAR and RSC, the water quality present at the root zone of the crop should be considered which would take into account the leaching factor in the field. The partial pressure of dissolved CO2 at the plants root zone also decides the calcium present in dissolved form in the field water. USDA follows the adjusted SAR for calculating water sodicity.

Soil improvement 
Alkaline soils with solid CaCO3 can be reclaimed with grass cultures, organic compost, waste hair / feathers, organic garbage, waste paper, rejected lemons/oranges, etc. ensuring the incorporation of much acidifying material (inorganic or organic material) into the soil, and enhancing dissolved Ca in the field water by releasing CO2 gas. Deep ploughing and incorporating the calcareous subsoil into the top soil also helps.

Many times salts' migration to the top soil takes place from the underground water sources rather than surface sources. Where the underground water table is high and the land is subjected to high solar radiation, ground water oozes to the land surface due to capillary action and gets evaporated leaving the dissolved salts in the top layer of the soil. Where the underground water contains high salts, it leads to acute salinity problem. This problem can be reduced by applying mulch to the land. Using poly-houses or shade netting during summer for cultivating vegetables/crops is also advised to mitigate soil salinity and conserve water / soil moisture. Poly-houses filter the intense summer solar radiation in tropical countries to save the plants from water stress and leaf burns.

Where the ground water quality is not alkaline / saline and ground water table is high, salts build up in the soil can be averted by using the land throughout the year for growing plantation trees / permanent crops with the help of lift irrigation. When the ground water is used at required leaching factor, the salts in the soil would not build up.

Plowing the field soon after cutting the crop is also advised to prevent salt migration to the top soil and conserve the soil moisture during the intense summer months. This is done to break the capillary pores in the soil to prevent water reaching the surface of the soil.

Clay soils in high annual rain fall (more than 100 cm) areas do not generally suffer from high alkalinity as the rain water runoff is able to reduce/leach the soil salts to comfortable levels if proper rainwater harvesting methods are followed. In some agricultural areas, the use of subsurface "tile lines" are used to facilitate drainage and leach salts. Continuous drip irrigation would lead to alkali soils formation in the absence of leaching / drainage water from the field.

It is also possible to reclaim alkaline soils by adding acidifying minerals like pyrite or cheaper alum or aluminium sulfate.

Alternatively, gypsum (calcium sulfate,  · 2 ) can also be applied as a source of Ca2+ ions to replace the sodium at the exchange complex. Gypsum also reacts with sodium carbonate to convert into sodium sulphate which is a neutral salt and does not contribute to high pH. There must be enough natural drainage to the underground, or else an artificial subsurface drainage system must be present, to permit leaching of the excess sodium by percolation of rain and/or irrigation water through the soil profile.

Calcium chloride is also used to reclaim alkali soils. CaCl2 converts Na2CO3 into NaCl precipitating CaCO3. NaCl is drained off by leaching water. Calcium nitrate has a similar effect, with NaNO3 in the leachate. Spent acid (HCl, H2SO4, etc.) can also be used to reduce the excess Na2CO3 in the soil/water.
 
Where urea is made available cheaply to farmers, it is also used to reduce the soil alkalinity / salinity primarily. The ammonium cation produced by urea hydrolysis which is a strongly sorbing cation exchanges with the weakly sorbing Na+ cation from the soil structure and Na+ is released into water. Thus alkali soils adsorb / consume more urea compared to other soils.

To reclaim the soils completely one needs prohibitively high doses of amendments. Most efforts are therefore directed to improving the top layer only (say the first 10 cm of the soils), as the top layer is most sensitive to deterioration of the soil structure. The treatments, however, need to be repeated in a few (say 5) years' time. Trees / plants follow gravitropism. It is difficult to survive in alkali soils for the trees with deeper rooting system which can be more than 60 meters deep in good non-alkali soils.

It will be important to refrain from irrigation (ground water or surface water) with poor quality water. In viticulture, adding naturally occurring chelating agents such as tartaric acid to irrigation water has been suggested, to solubilize calcium and magnesium carbonates in sodic soils.

One way of reducing sodium carbonate is to cultivate glasswort or saltwort or barilla plants. These plants sequester the sodium carbonate they absorb from alkali soil into their tissues. The ash of these plants contains good quantity of sodium carbonate which can be commercially extracted and used in place of sodium carbonate derived from  common salt which is highly energy intensive process. Thus alkali lands deterioration can be checked by cultivating barilla plants which can serve as food source, biomass fuel and raw material for soda ash and potash, etc.

Leaching saline sodic soils
Saline soils are mostly also sodic (the predominant salt is sodium chloride), but they do not have a very high pH nor a poor infiltration rate. Upon leaching they are usually not converted into a (sodic) alkali soil as the Na+ ions are easily removed. Therefore, saline (sodic) soils mostly do not need gypsum applications for their reclamation.

See also 

 Ammonia volatilization from urea
 Agreti green vegetable
 Barilla
 Biosalinity
 Cation-exchange capacity
 Drip irrigation
 Environmental impact of irrigation
 Fertilizer
 Halotolerance
 Index of soil-related articles
 Phosphate rich organic manure
 Phosphogypsum
 Red mud
 Residual Sodium Carbonate Index
 Sajji Khar
 Soda lake
 Soil fertility
 Soil pH
 Soil salinity
 Soil salinity control

References

Alkaline soils
Land reclamation